Boydell Glacier is a glacier on Trinity Peninsula in northern Graham Land. It was mapped by the Falkland Islands Dependencies Survey from surveys (1960–61), and named by the UK Antarctic Place-Names Committee for James Boydell, English inventor of a steam traction engine, the first practical track-laying vehicle.

See also
 List of glaciers in the Antarctic
 Glaciology

References

External links
 SCAR Composite Antarctic Gazetteer

Glaciers of Trinity Peninsula